The Battle of al-Baida was fought in 874 or 875. The Saffarids under Ya'qub ibn al-Layth defeated the Kharijite leader Muhammad ibn Wasil.

References

Saffarid dynasty
Kharijites
Shiraz
Battles involving Iran
870s conflicts